is a song by Japanese singer-songwriter Rina Aiuchi. It was released on 7 May 2008 through Giza Studio, as the fourth single from her sixth studio album Trip. The single reached number seventeen in Japan and has sold over 8,303 copies nationwide. The song served as the theme songs to the Japanese television show, Koisuru Hanikami.

Track listing

Charts

Certification and sales

|-
! scope="row"| Japan (RIAJ)
| 
| 8,303 
|-
|}

Release history

References

2008 singles
2008 songs
J-pop songs
Song recordings produced by Daiko Nagato
Songs written by Rina Aiuchi